Liraz Charhi is an Israeli actress, singer and dancer.

Early life
Charhi was born in Ramla, Israel, to an Iranian Jewish family. Her aunt is Israeli singer and actress Rita.

She was enlisted as a soldier to the Israel Defense Forces, serving in the military band of the Education and Youth Corps, until 1999.

Career
Charhi began singing and performing at the age of 5, and made her debut as stage actress at the Habima National Theatre, where she worked professionally from 11 to 14; then she studied at the Beit Zvi Stage Arts School.
She appeared in the Israeli TV series Ha-Masa'it in 2002 and gained further attention after a nomination by the Israeli Film Academy (Ophir Award) for her role in the 2004 film  Turn Left at the End of the World (Sof Ha'Olam Smola). She was invited to the Israel Film Festival in Los Angeles in 2006, after which she broke into Hollywood.

Charhi has since become known for her roles in the French mini TV series Revivre, and the films, Fair Game (2010) and A Late Quartet (2012) in which she played the jogger and flamenco dancing girlfriend of Philip Seymour Hoffman.

As a singer she has released the singles "Od Tzohorayim" and "Al Tafsik" which have been played on radio in Israel. Charhi's first album sung in Persian, Naz, was released in 2018.

In November 2020, Charhi's second Persian album, titled Zan (meaning "woman"), was released on Glitterbeat Records in collaboration with Raman Loveworld and some other Iranian artists. Some artists collaborated anonymously, and some have joined the project publicly, despite the risks involved in collaborating with an Israeli artist. The first release from the album was "Injah".

In 2020, she played Yael Kadosh, an Israeli Mossad agent in the Israeli espionage television series Tehran, written by Zonder and Omri Shenhar and directed by Daniel Syrkin. The series is about the Iran–Israel proxy conflict; and it premiered in Israel on 22 June 2020 and on 25 September 2020 internationally on Apple TV+.

Personal life
She was married to Israeli composer and conductor Ziv "Kojo" Cojocaru from 2004 to 2010. She married Israeli actor Tom Avni in 2013, and they have two daughters.

Discography

Albums
Naz (2018)
Zan (November 2020)
Roya (October 7, 2022)

Songs / videos
Zan Bezan (2019)
Injah (2020)
Bia Bia (2020)

Filmography

References

External links
 
Interview at the Jewish Journal
Iranian musicians help out in secret on Israeli singer's new record at "the Guardian"
INTERVIEW at "Songlines"

Israeli Jews
Israeli television actresses
Israeli film actresses
21st-century Israeli women singers
1978 births
Living people
People from Ramla
Beit Zvi School for the Performing Arts alumni
Israeli expatriates in the United States
Israeli people of Iranian descent